Theodore Christianson (June 4, 1913 – September 19, 1955) was an American jurist.

Early life and education 
Born in Dawson, Minnesota, Christianson graduated from University High School in 1931. He then received his bachelor's degree from University of Minnesota in 1935 and his law degree from University of Minnesota Law School in 1937.

Career 
After graduating from law school, Christianson practiced law in Saint Paul, Minnesota. During World War II, Christianson served in the United States Navy. Christianson served on the Minnesota Supreme Court from 1950 until his death in 1955.

Personal life 
Christianson's father was Governor Theodore Christianson. He died suddenly of a heart attack at his home in Saint Paul, Minnesota.

References

1913 births
1955 deaths
People from Dawson, Minnesota
University of Minnesota alumni
University of Minnesota Law School alumni
Justices of the Minnesota Supreme Court
20th-century American judges
United States Navy personnel of World War II